The Chester Kingsley House is an historic house in Cambridge, Massachusetts.

Description and history
The oldest portion of this architecturally eclectic house was built in 1866, with Second Empire styling. The original owner was Chester W. Kingsley, a local politician, and the builder was Stephen Stiles. Kingsley had the house remodeled in 1890, adding a tower and ell. At the same time, the house's Second Empire ornament was replaced with Queen Anne and Colonial Revival ornament. Wellington Fillmore was the builder who executed the work. Kingsley and his wife lived in the house until their deaths in 1904. In 1908 the house was leased by Mae I. Copp and Minnie A. Copp as a private hospital, which became known as the Chester Hospital. During the occupancy of the Copp sisters, the house was altered several times, most substantially in 1919, when architect William Sidebottom designed a three-story extension to the ell.

The house was later a nursing home, and is now apartments. It was listed on the National Register of Historic Places in 1982.

See also
National Register of Historic Places listings in Cambridge, Massachusetts

References

Houses completed in 1866
Houses on the National Register of Historic Places in Cambridge, Massachusetts
1866 establishments in Massachusetts